Mia Diadromi (A way) is an album by popular Greek artist Natasa Theodoridou, released in 2003 by Sony Music Greece. The album went gold. It is the first live album by Natasa Theodoridou and it includes recordings from her sold-out live appearances in "Fos" music hall in Athens. This album was followed by a DVD release including the whole concert.

Track listing

References

Natasa Theodoridou albums
Greek-language albums
2003 live albums
Columbia Records live albums
Sony Music Greece live albums